The British Academy Television Award for Best Mini-Series is one of the major categories of the British Academy Television Awards (BAFTAs), the primary awards ceremony of the British television industry. The category is described by the BAFTA website as being for "a drama series, between two and 19 episodes, that tells a complete story and is not intended to return". The category has been awarded since 2012, prior to that a similar category was awarded named Best Drama Serial, which was presented with the Best Drama Series category under the name Best Drama Series or Serial from 1970 to 1991 and as a separate category from 1992 to 2011.

Winners and nominees

1990s
Best Drama Serial

2000s
Best Drama Serial

2010s 
Best Drama Serial

Best Mini-Series

2020s 

Note: The series that don't have recipients on the tables had Production team credited as recipients for the award or nomination.

References

External links 
 List of winners at the British Academy of Film and Television Arts

Mini-Series
British drama
2012 establishments in the United Kingdom
Awards established in 2012